Kentiopsis magnifica (formerly Mackeea magnifica) is a species of flowering plant in the family Arecaceae. It is found only in New Caledonia.

References

magnifica
Endemic flora of New Caledonia
Vulnerable plants
Taxonomy articles created by Polbot